Bolgary is a rural locality (a village) in Kultayevskoye Rural Settlement, Permsky District, Perm Krai, Russia. The population was 159 as of 2010. There are 22 streets.

Geography 
Bolgary is located 31 km southwest of Perm (the district's administrative centre) by road. Protasy is the nearest rural locality.

References 

Rural localities in Permsky District